The 2007 Firestone Indy 400 was a race in the 2007 IRL IndyCar Series, held at Michigan International Speedway. It was held over the weekend of August 3–5, 2007, as the thirteenth round of the seventeen-race calendar. It was the last race, for the time being, for the IndyCar Series at the track. The race was also notable in that only seven cars were running at the finish, after a massive accident on lap 144 of the race which included Dario Franchitti flipping upside-down after hitting Dan Wheldon. Franchitti would walk away unharmed.

Classification

References 
IndyCar Series

Firestone Indy 400
Michigan Indy 400
Michigan Indy 400
Michigan Indy 400